Nomada affabilis is a species of nomad bee in the family Apidae. It is found in North America.

Subspecies
These two subspecies belong to the species Nomada affabilis:
 Nomada affabilis affabilis Cresson, 1878
 Nomada affabilis dallasensis Cockerell, 1911

References

Further reading

 

Nomadinae
Articles created by Qbugbot
Insects described in 1878